Permanent Damage is the only studio album by The GTOs. The album was released in 1969 on Straight Records.

Track listing
All tracks composed by Davy Jones and Miss Sparky; lyrics by GTOs (Girls Together Outrageously); except where indicated

Personnel
The GTOs
Miss Christine - vocals
Miss Mercy - vocals
Miss Cinderella - vocals
Miss Pamela - vocals
Miss Sandra - vocals
Musicians
Jeff Beck, Lowell George, Ry Cooder - guitar
Roy Estrada - bass guitar
Craig Doerge, Ian Underwood, Nicky Hopkins - keyboards
Don Preston - synthesizer
Jimmy Carl Black - drums
Frank Zappa - tambourine
Rod Stewart - vocals on "The Ghost Chained to the Past, Present, and Future (Shock Treatment)"
Cynthia Albritton - voice on telephone connection on "Miss Christine's First Conversation With the Plaster Casters of Chicago"

References

1969 debut albums
Albums produced by Frank Zappa
albums produced by Russ Titelman
Straight Records albums
Reprise Records albums